"O'Brien is Tryin' to Learn to Talk Hawaiian" is a World War I era song written by Al Dubin and Rennie Cormack in 1916.

Reception
"O'Brien is Tryin' to Learn to Talk Hawaiian" peaked at number two on the US song charts in January 1917.

Lyrics

References

1916 songs
Songs of World War I
Songs with lyrics by Al Dubin
Victor Records singles